The Gruppenhorchgerät ('group listening device', abbreviated GHG) was a hydrophone array which was used on Nazi Germany's U-boats in World War II.

Development 
In World War I carbon microphones were still used as sound receivers. The individual receivers were mostly placed in the front part of the vessel along the hull sides to have enough distance from the screw and the noise they emitted. The individual microphones were arranged in groups and each was oriented in a different direction. The individual microphones had to be connected manually to take bearings. They were not very reliable, so other transducers were experimented with. Dynamic microphones were also discarded. At the end of the process, the piezoelectric principle was deemed the most suitable. This was discovered by Pierre Curie in 1880. The quartz crystals generate electric voltage depending on the pressure acting on it.

In collaboration with the Imperial German Navy, Atlas Werke AG in Bremen and Electroacustik (ELAC) in Kiel worked on piezoelectric transducers and the development of detectors and amplifiers in general.
They experimented with different kinds of crystals, or combinations of several of them. The best result rendered the Seignette crystal, which is formed from a mixture of different salts. From 1935 crystal receivers were permanently installed on all German submarines. Modern submarines still use electrostriction and barium titanate converters today.

Group listening device 
The group listening device (‘’Gruppenhorchgerät’’), abbreviated "GHG", consisted of two groups of 24 sensors (one group on each side of the ship). Each sensor had a tube preamplifier. These 48 low frequency signals were then routed to a switching matrix in the main unit. The sonar operator could determine the ship's side and the exact direction of the sound source. To improve the resolution, there were three switchable crossover with 1, 3 and 6 kHz center frequency. A disadvantage of the side mounting, was a dead zone of 40 ° to fore and aft.
Range: 20 km to individual drivers, 100 km against Convoy

Search area: 2 × 140 °
Resolution: <1 ° at 6 kHz, 1.5 ° for 3 kHz, 4 ° for 1 kHz; without crossover 8 °

In May 1942  was captured by the British Royal Navy. The submarine’s ELAC equipment was thoroughly analyzed; the above resolution values were determined.

Balkon
The GHG fitted to early U-boats could not be used effectively at periscope depth.

References

 Die Sonaranlagen der deutschen U-Boote, Entwicklung, Erprobung, Einsatz und Wirkung akustischer Ortungs- und Täuschungseinrichtungen der deutschen Unterseeboote. Bernard & Graefe, September 2006, 
 Eberhard Rössler: Die deutschen U-Boote und ihre Werften. Bernard & Graefe, 1990, 
 Heinrich Stenzel: Leitfaden zur Berechnung von Schallvorgängen. Holt, 1947 Seiten 678–679
 Willem Hackmann: Seek & Strike Sonar, anti-submarine warfare and the Royal Navy 1914–54. Science Museum, London 1984, 
 
 Eberhard Rössler: Die Sonaranlagen der deutschen Unterseeboote. Koehler, Herford, 1991, 2. Auflage, 
 Beschreibung einer K.D.B.-Anlage für Oberflächenschiffe, Atlas-Werke Aktiengesellschaft (Herausg.), Nr. 472, (K.D.B. = Kristall-Dreh-Basis = Empfängerbasis), Bremen, 1938, Halbleineneinband, Großformat, 49 Seiten, 81 Falttafeln, Anlagen, GEHEIM,
 Verfahren zur Richtungsbestimmung von Schallsignalen, Reichspatentamt, Nr. 320/29 im August 1918
 Über Hörempfindungen im Ultraschallgebiet bei Knochenleitung, Atlas-Werke AG., Bremen 1940

External links
 Vortrag Chef N Wa I am 10. März 1944 vor der Arbeitsgemeinschaft „Ortungsgeräte“ (PDF; 1,3 MB)
 Erzeugung von Ultraschall mit Ferriten, Ulrich Enz, Zürich 1955
 Paul Profos,Tilo Pfeifer: Handbuch der industriellen Messtechnik. Oldenbourg, 1994, 
 u-historia.com
 German Hydrophones
 
 Development of Underwater Sound and Detection Equipment
 S-Gerät und ASDIC
 ''Evaluation of German Sonic Listening Equipment „GHG“ on the USS Witek’’

Microphones
U-boats
World War II German electronics
Sonar
German inventions of the Nazi period